The ' Master of Arts in Theological Studies (MATS or MAT) satisfies a variety of broad academic and vocational purposes. It can be suited to the pastor, layman or beginning academic as an entry-level master's degree in theology or the professional standard, the master of divinity. The MAT is often geared toward individuals seeking an introductory graduate degree in religion for service in a supportive role in their local congregation as lay ministers. Depending upon the school, the program can vary from as little as 32 to 40 semester/ hours. It may or may not include a thesis, capstone or summation. Frequently, it is a classwork-only degree.

Programs of Study
The degree may take several different forms, such as:
M.A.T.S. (General theology degree non-specified)
Biblical Studies
Systematic Theology
Old Testament
New Testament
Historical Theology
Christian Apologetics

Accreditation
The Master of Arts in Theological Studies is a degree recognized by accrediting agencies such as the ATS (Association of Theological Schools), TRACS (the Transnational Association of Christian Colleges and Schools), the ABHE (Association for Biblical Higher Education) and other accrediting bodies. It is classified as a Category D: Basic Program Oriented Toward General Theological Studies by the ATS (Association of Theological Schools).

Degree Status
While requiring only about 1/4 to 1/2 of the credit hours (normally 36 hours verses 92 to 72 hours) that are required of the prestigious M.Div (Master of Divinity), the MAT is generally considered a prerequisite for entering advanced degree programs such as the STM (Master of Sacred Theology) or doctoral studies. However, the student will likely be required to know (or learn remedially) Greek, Hebrew, Latin, German or another modern language in order to enter an advanced degree program if they haven't learned these yet.

References

 http://edglossary.org/capstone-project/
 http://www2.ed.gov/admins/finaid/accred/accreditation_pg6.html
 http://docs.ats.edu/uploads/accrediting/documents/accrediting-standards-architecture.pdf

Christianity studies